Willie Murphy is a retired Irish sportsperson.  He played hurling with his local club Rower–Inistioge and was a member of the Kilkenny senior inter-county team from the 1960s until the 1970s.  With Kilkenny Murphy an All-Ireland title  and two Leinster titles.

References

Living people
Rower-Inistioge hurlers
Kilkenny inter-county hurlers
All-Ireland Senior Hurling Championship winners
Year of birth missing (living people)